Barranquilla Fútbol Club is a professional Colombian football team based in Barranquilla, that currently plays in the Categoría Primera B. They play their home games at the Estadio Romelio Martínez.

History
Barranquilla F.C. was founded in January 2005 by a group of businessmen led by Arturo Char who considering that Barranquilla did not have a team in the Primera B, decided to give the city a new alternative.

Barranquilla F.C. has always been strongly supported by the lower divisions of Junior. Even the former president of Junior Alejandro Arteta was previously president of Barranquilla F.C. The team has not won any title in the Primera B, but has always been a great promoter of the tournament, qualifying to several finals and displaying great football. Its home stadium is the Romelio Martínez, former home of Junior de Barranquilla.

Stadium

Barranquilla FC uses Romelio Martínez Stadium for their home matches, which has a capacity of 8,600 spectators.

Squad

Affiliated clubs
 Junior

References

External links
 Official Website

Football clubs in Colombia
Association football clubs established in 2005
2005 establishments in Colombia
Categoría Primera B clubs